Bungur is an administrative village in the Senen district of Indonesia. It has postal code of 10460.

See also 
 Senen
 List of administrative villages of Jakarta

Administrative villages in Jakarta